Orenburg Bashkir Pedagogical College is a school in Orenburg, worked in 1921–1936, respectively. Forge Bashkir national intelligentsia.

Students are trained in the building Orenburg Caravanserai, historical and cultural monuments of the Bashkir people.

Notable alumni 
 Sagit Agish (1905–1973) - Bashkir writer
 Sagid R. Alibaev (1903—1975) - Soviet statesman and teacher
 Gabdulla Amantay (1907–1938) Bashkir writer
 Zainab Biisheva (1908–1996) – Bashkir writer
 Bayezit Bikbay (1909–1968) - Bashkir writer
 Guinan Khairy (1903—1938) - Bashkir writer
 Sabit Sufiyanov (1904–1974) - Bashkir writer

References 

Organizations based in Bashkortostan
Secondary schools in Russia
Education in Bashkortostan